In shogi, Sakata Opposing Rook (阪田流向かい飛車 or 坂田流向かい飛車 sakata-ryū mukai hisha) is an Opposing Rook opening.

It refers to the case in a Double Static Rook situation in which Gote (White) switches energetically to an Opposing Rook variation. The origin of this strategy is dated back to the Edo period, but it was after a famous match that shogi Master Sankichi Sakata (1870-1946) played against Ichitarō Doi in May of 1919, that it became popular and the opening started being named after him.

Overview

In a Double Static Rook situation following 1. P-76, P-34, 2. P-26, G-32, 3. P-25, Gote (White) opposes with ...B-33, 4. Bx33+, Gx33, and then by moving the rook along the 2nd. rank. There are strategies for both early fight and slow games, but still the emphasis is on constraining ( osaeru) rather than on exchanging pieces (sabaki) which makes it easy to handle in the center.

While counter-attacking by attacking Black's rook pawn is plain and simple, when in combination with Wrong Diagonal Bishop and others, it carries a big destructive power.

See also

 Opposing Rook
 Direct Opposing Rook
 Ranging Rook

Bibliography

豊川孝弘 『パワーアップ戦法塾』 NHK出版 2004年
豊川孝弘 『阪田流向かい飛車戦法』（『将棋世界2010年8月号』付録） 日本将棋連盟  2010年

External links

 Shogi (etc) Diary in Japan
 Sakata-Opposing Rook
 Example Game of Sakata-Opposing Rook
 Quest of the Lost Systems: Furibisha: Sakata-ryu Mukaibisha
 アゲアゲ☆将棋実況 YouTube channel: アナログ棋譜並べ: 渡辺明 vs 佐藤天彦: 阪田流向かい飛車 · professional game example with comments by ex-professional apprentice 
 将棋DB２: 
 渡瀬荘次郎 vs. 小林東四郎 渡瀬荘次郎 vs Touhakusai Kobayashi game from 1862
 淡路仁茂 vs 桐山清澄 Hitoshige Awaji vs Kiyozumi Kiriyama game from 1994
 Alexei's YouTube channel: Tactical defense: Fujii Souta-Akutsu, 27th Ginga Tournament Block E

Shogi openings
Ranging Rook openings
Opposing Rook openings